Into the Dragon's Lair is an adventure module for the 3rd edition of the Dungeons & Dragons fantasy role-playing game.

Plot summary
Into the Dragon's Lair takes place in the Forgotten Realms setting, and takes place after the novels The High Road and The Death of a Dragon by Troy Denning. The nation of Cormyr tries to rebuild after the death of King Azoun IV, and seeks the treasure hoard of a dragon to fund these efforts and keep the kingdom from falling into chaos. The player characters must find this treasure before all the other seekers.

Publication history
Into the Dragon's Lair was published in 2000, and was written by Steve Miller and Sean K Reynolds, with cover art by Paul Bonner and interior art by Michael Collins.

Reception
The reviewer from Pyramid suggested that "for the most part it's a standard hunt for treasure", but commented: "While sounding simple, during the course of the adventure, the players must deal with not one, but two rival groups of adventurers."

References

Forgotten Realms adventures
Role-playing game supplements introduced in 2000